Zhou's leopard gecko (Goniurosaurus zhoui) is a species of geckos endemic to Hainan Island, China.

References

Goniurosaurus
Reptiles of China
Reptiles described in 2018